In India, a driving licence is an official document that authorises its holder to operate various types of motor vehicles on highways and some other roads to which the public has access. In various Indian states, they are administered by the Regional Transport Authorities/Offices (RTA/RTO). A driving licence is required in India by any person driving a vehicle on any highway or other road defined in the Motor Vehicles Act, 1988. This act sets limits on the minimum age for vehicle operation ranging from 16 to 20, depending on specific circumstances.
A modern photo of the driving licence can also serve many of the purposes of an identity card in non-driving contexts such as proof of identity (e.g. when opening a bank account) or age (e.g. when applying for a mobile connection).

Background 
Applications for a provisional driving licence can be made from the age of 16. Valid for driving a moped or gearless motorcycle from aged 16, and a car or any motor vehicle other than a transport vehicle who are aged 18 or older. The common "All India Permit" allows the licensee to drive throughout the country. For driving commercial/transport vehicles, one should obtain endorsement (and a minimum age of 20 years, in some states) in the driving licence to effect under s.3(1) of The Motor Vehicles Act, 1988. Until a driving test (which consists of three sections: verbal or written test (depending on the state), road sign test followed by a supervised driving examination) has been passed a driver may hold only a provisional licence and be subject to certain conditions.

The conditions attached to provisional licences of a particular category of vehicle are:
 L-plates must be conspicuously displayed on the front and rear of the vehicle.
 Learner drivers of a particular category and transmission type of vehicle must be accompanied by somebody who has held a full driving licence for that category and transmission type, except in the case of solo motorcycles and vehicles of certain categories designed solely for one person.
 Motorcycle riders must not carry any pillion passengers.
 Bus drivers must not carry any passenger except a person giving or receiving instruction.

Anyone applying for a driving licence for the first time has to apply for a learner licence (LLR) as a prerequisite. If you have a learner’s permit, you are only permitted to drive while under a licensed driver’s supervision.

After passing a driving test, the provisional licence may be surrendered in exchange for a full Indian licence for the relevant kind of vehicle. Full car licences allow use of mopeds, motorcycles and cars.

A licence is valid until the age of 40, if applied before 30 years of age. Between 30 to 50 years of age, it is valid for 10 years. From 50 to 55 years of age, it is valid until the holder's 60th birthday. Above 55 years of age, it is valid for 5 years under the Motor Vehicles (Amendment) Act, 2019. The driving licence is required to be renewed after the expiry of its validity. It previously had 20 years of validity.

Theory testing 
Tests on basic driving rules are conducted at the RTOs when an individual applies for a provisional licence. The theoretical test in India consists of basic road sign questions, which are the same for car and motorcycle tests:
 Multiple choice questions – questions with a choice of possible answers. At least nine questions should be answered correctly to pass this section.
 Verbal or written test (depending on the state).
The theory test is completed on the computer, and both must be passed in order to pass the theory test.

Driving licence categories

This is a list of the categories that might be found on a driving licence in India.

MC 50CC (Motorcycle 50cc) — motorcycles with an engine capacity of up to 50cc.
MC EX50CC (Motorcycle more than 50cc) — motorcycles, light motor vehicle, and cars.
 Motorcycles/Scooters of any engine capacity, with or without gears with an engine capacity of 50cc or more (old category).
MC Without Gear or M/CYCL.WOG (Motorcycle Without Gear) — motorcycles, scooters without gears, all motorcycles.
MCWG or MC With Gear or M/CYCL.WG (Motorcycle With Gear) — all motorcycles, engine capacity more than 175cc.
LMV-NT (Light Motor Vehicle—Non Transport) — for personal use only.
LMV-INVCRG-NT (Light Motor Vehicle—Invalid Carrige-Non Transport) — for personal use by physically handicapped persons only.
LMV-TR (Light Motor Vehicle—Transport) — for commercial transportation including light goods carrier.
'LMV (Light Motor Vehicle)' — including cars, jeeps, taxis, delivery vans.(16th Apr 2018 GOI Ministry of Road Tran & Highways No. RT-11021/44/2017-MVL).
LDRXCV (Loader, Excavator, Hydraulic Equipment) — for Commercial application of all hydraulic heavy equipment.
HMV (Heavy Motor Vehicle) — a person holding an LMV driving licence can only apply for a heavy licence.
HPMV (Heavy Passenger Motor Vehicle).
HTV Heavy Transport Vehicle (Heavy Goods Motor Vehicle, Heavy Passenger Motor Vehicle).
TRANS (Heavy Goods Motor Vehicle, Heavy Passenger Motor Vehicle).
TRAILR — for all kinds of trailers.
AGTLR — (Agricultural Tractor and Power Tiller) A person holding an AGTLR can drive an Agricultural tractor and Power tiller on farms, local roads, some Major District Roads and some highways without a trailer. (most of the highways are restricted for farm machinery and slow-moving equipment, some jurisdiction have different rules, so the operator need to go through the concerned Authority).
Additional Endorsement of Driving Licence — (AEDL) Private/Commercial drivers should have an additional Badge if they are driving a taxi or any other public transport vehicle.
In order to drive a Vehicle carrying hazardous goods, the driver must have an additional Hazzard Goods Endorsement in addition to a Transport class licence or LMV class on their licence.
To drive a motor vehicle in hilly terrain or a ghat section the driver needs a Hill Driver Endorsement.

Most of the legislation regarding licensing is in the Rules of the Road Regulation and the Motor Vehicles Act, 1988.

Points and endorsements
India uses cumulative points systems, broadly similar but different in detail in different countries, for offenders.

Points are given for driving offences by law courts, and the licence is endorsed accordingly.
An Indian driving licence may be endorsed by the courts for various offences, not only for those committed whilst driving or in charge of a vehicle. If the individual committing the offence does not hold a valid driving licence the driver is subject to be penalised or face imprisonment of up to 3 months.
Violation of traffic signals, triple driving on motorcycle, using vehicles without registration or in unsafe condition may endorse and attract 3 negative points in each case.

In the case of two-wheelers, helmet laws are mandatory for the main rider and the pillion rider. Offences such as for drink or drug driving are recorded on the licence and the offender is prosecuted and imprisoned.

Twelve points on the licence makes the driver liable to cancellation/suspension of driving licence for one year; accumulation of twelve points for the second consecutive time would lead to suspension of driving licence for five years.

Production 

Drivers are legally obliged to carry a valid driving licence while driving. Under s.130 of the Motor Vehicles Act, 1988; a police officer or any other official authorised by the government can ask for vehicle-related documents, and the driver should produce them within 15 days at the police station (or the concerned department).

The law permits officials to seize a licence, and issue a temporary one for a specified time. The law also allows the state government to set fines or prison terms for minor traffic violations, and specifies who has the rights to enforce these rules.

Every driving licence has a maximum number of endorsements allowed. If the driver does not follow the traffic rules or causes any fault, then a penalty fine is issued and an endorsement put on the licence. An excessive number of endorsements may lead to cancellation.

See also

 Driving in India
 Speed limits in India
 Road signs in India

References 

Road transport in India
Identity documents of India